The 1937 FIRA Tournament was the second Rugby Union European championship, organized by the recently formed FIRA. It was played in Paris during the Exposition Internationale des Arts et Techniques dans la Vie Moderne.

Preliminary round

Semifinals

5th place final

3rd place final

Final

References 

 FIRA Trophy, France - Italy

External links
 FIRA-AER official website

1937
1937 rugby union tournaments for national teams
1936–37 in French rugby union
1936–37 in Italian rugby union
International rugby union competitions hosted by France
rugby union
rugby union
rugby union
rugby union